Nykirke is a village in the municipality of Horten, Norway, located near the E18. Its population as of 2005 is 662. It has its own church, which is more than 800 years old.

Famous people 
Jørgen Jalland – footballer
Olaf Tufte – competition rower, two times Olympic gold medalist

Villages in Vestfold og Telemark